Montreux Business University (MBU) is a private school located in Montreux, Vaud, at the foot of the Alps and on the shores of Lake Geneva, in the French-speaking part of Switzerland. MBU provides a range of on-site programs: Bachelor's, Master's, MBA, Executive MBA, DBA (Doctor of Business Administration), it also conducts courses through online studies. All courses are conducted in English by international and multicultural faculty.

History
Established in 2011 as Montreux Business School, it was renamed in October 2015 to Montreux Business University after receiving an accreditation of Accreditation Council for Business Schools and Programs (ACBSP).

The institution is housed in a Belle Époque building that first opened its doors as a hotel in the 19th century.

Accreditations & memberships

Swiss

The Montreux Business University is not an accredited Swiss university.

International

Montreux Business University is a fully accredited member of the ACBSP  (Accreditation Council for Business Schools and Programs). MBU is a registered member of AACSB International (Association to Advance Collegiate Schools of Business), EFMD (European Foundation for Management Development) and CEEMAN (Central and East European Management Development Association).

References

External links 
Montreux Business University official website

Business schools in Switzerland
Private schools in Switzerland